Sir Hugh Stevenson Roberton (23 February 18747 October 1952) was a Scottish composer and Britain's leading choral-master.

Roberton was born in Glasgow, where, in 1906, he founded the Glasgow Orpheus Choir. For five years before that it was the Toynbee Musical Association. A perfectionist, he expected the highest standards of performance from its members. Its voice was a choir voice, its individual voices not tolerated. He set new standards in choral technique and interpretation. For almost fifty years, until it disbanded in 1951 on the retirement of its founder, the Glasgow Orpheus Choir had no equal in Britain and toured widely enjoying world acclaim. Their repertoire included many Scottish folk songs arranged for choral performance, and Paraphrases, as well as Italian madrigals, English motets and the music of the Russian Orthodox Church. The choir also performed the works of Johann Sebastian Bach, George Frideric Handel, Felix Mendelssohn, Peter Cornelius, Johannes Brahms and others.

He wrote the choral work  All in the April Evening (words by Katharine Tynan) and the popular songs Westering Home and Mairi's Wedding. He wrote alternative lyrics for Dashing White Sergeant.

Roberton was knighted in the 1931 New Year's Honours. He was a pacifist and member of the Peace Pledge Union. For this reason both he and the Glasgow Orpheus Choir were banned by the BBC from broadcasting during the Second World War.

The Australian politician and diplomat Hugh Roberton was his son.

References

Sources
Dictionary of National Biography
University of Glasgow
Orpheus with his Lute - A Glasgow Orpheus Choir Anthology published in 1963
National Portrait Gallery

External links
 
 

1874 births
1952 deaths
Scottish composers
Scottish pacifists
Knights Bachelor
Conductors (music) awarded knighthoods
Composers awarded knighthoods
Musicians from Glasgow
Scottish knights